Yang Han-yeol (born August 17, 2003) is a South Korean actor. He is known for his roles in dramas such as Love & Secret, A Thousand Days' Promise, The Greatest Love, Goddess of Marriage and All of Us Are Dead.

Filmography

Television series

Film

Awards and nominations

References

External links 
 
 

2003 births
Living people
21st-century South Korean male actors
South Korean male television actors
South Korean male film actors